Lavelanet-de-Comminges (literally Lavelanet of Comminges) is a commune in the Haute-Garonne department in southwestern France.

Population

The inhabitants of the commune are known as Lavelanéciens

Geography
The commune is bordered by four other communes: Le Fousseret to the northwest, Cazères to the southwest, Saint-Élix-le-Château to the northeast, and finally by Saint-Julien-sur-Garonne to the southeast.

Twin towns
Lavelanet-de-Comminges is twinned with:
  Brazii, Romania
  Narthang, China

See also
Communes of the Haute-Garonne department

References

Communes of Haute-Garonne
Comminges